Sonja Viola Edström-Ruthström (Edström before 1960, 18 November 1930 – 15 October 2020) was a Swedish cross-country skier. She competed at the 1952, 1956, and 1960 Olympics in the 10 km and 3 × 5 km relay events and won bronze medals in both in 1956; in 1960 she finished fifth in the 10 km, but won the 3 × 5 km relay.

Edström also won two 3 × 5 km relay bronze medals at the FIS Nordic World Ski Championships in 1954 and 1958. She won the 10 km event at the Holmenkollen ski festival in 1956. In 1953–1960, she collected 12 individual and three relay national titles.

Edström was born in a family of six siblings, and was mostly raised by her father, as her mother fell seriously ill when Edström was six years old. At 14 she started working as a maid, and at 16 as a bottles cleaner at the Luleå Brewery. She was later a nurse at a Luleå hospital for more than 30 years.

Cross-country skiing results
All results are sourced from the International Ski Federation (FIS).

Olympic Games
 3 medals – (1 gold, 2 bronze)

World Championships
 2 medals – (2 bronze)

References

Further reading

External links

 
 
  

1930 births
2020 deaths
People from Luleå
Cross-country skiers from Norrbotten County
Olympic cross-country skiers of Sweden
Cross-country skiers at the 1952 Winter Olympics
Cross-country skiers at the 1956 Winter Olympics
Cross-country skiers at the 1960 Winter Olympics
Olympic gold medalists for Sweden
Olympic bronze medalists for Sweden
Holmenkollen Ski Festival winners
Swedish female cross-country skiers
Olympic medalists in cross-country skiing
FIS Nordic World Ski Championships medalists in cross-country skiing
Medalists at the 1956 Winter Olympics
Medalists at the 1960 Winter Olympics